Ivor John Hughes (28 February 1939 – 23 August 1966) was a motorcycle speedway rider with the Cradley Heath Heathens team during the 1960s. He died following a track accident at the Dudley Wood Stadium on Saturday 20 August 1966 in the final heat of the British League match against Sheffield Tigers. His off-track occupation was a plumber in his home town of Berriew, Powys, Wales.

Career
Born in Middletown, near Welshpool Hughes started motorcycling with the local Clive Motorcycle Club, being a founder member, before turning to speedway with the purchase of a JAP machine at the end 1963 and after-the-meeting rides at Stoke. 

During June 1964 he made his first team appearance riding for Wolverhampton Wolves and then joined Cradley. By the end of 1965 he achieved an average of 2.89 for Cradley and 6.00 for Exeter Falcons. His breakthrough year was 1966 and on 21 May, he top scored for Cradley and challenged the three time World champion (soon to be 4) Barry Briggs for the Silver Sash. On 10 August in a match against Swedish team Vagarna he beat the current world champion at the time Björn Knutsson in a scratch race.

Hughes would never fulfil his potential because ten days later going into the final heat of the match against Sheffield Tigers he was involved in a crash with Bob Paulson. He suffered a serious head injury and died three days later in hospital.

After his death an Ivor Hughes Memorial Trophy has been presented annually in his honour by the Cradley club, either raced for or awarded.

References 

1939 births
1966 deaths
British speedway riders
Welsh speedway riders
English motorcycle racers
Cradley Heathens riders